Jeff Boyd (born April 17, 1958 in Riverside, California) was a Canadian Football League receiver for the Winnipeg Blue Bombers and the Toronto Argonauts who, in a 9-year career from 1983–1991, caught 69 touchdown passes. He won two Grey Cups, 1984 with Winnipeg and 1991 with Toronto.

References

1958 births
Living people
Players of American football from Riverside, California
Canadian football wide receivers
Edmonton Elks players
Toronto Argonauts players
Winnipeg Blue Bombers players
Players of Canadian football from California